After Prison, What? is a Canadian short documentary film directed by Ron Weyman for the National Film Board of Canada and released in 1951. The film was narrated by Lorne Greene.

Plot
The film centres on Charles Brown, a man who is struggling to adjust back to society after being released from Kingston Penitentiary.

Awards
The film won the Canadian Film Award for Best Theatrical Short Film at the 3rd Canadian Film Awards in 1951.

References

External links
 
 

1950s English-language films
1951 documentary films
1951 short films
Canadian short documentary films
Best Theatrical Short Film Genie and Canadian Screen Award winners
National Film Board of Canada documentaries
Quebec films
National Film Board of Canada short films
Canadian black-and-white films
Films set in Ontario
Films produced by Sydney Newman
1950s short documentary films
Documentary films about the penal system in Canada
1950s Canadian films